Franco Nicolás Quiroz (born 11 March 1998) is an Argentine professional footballer who plays as a left-back for San Martín de Tucumán, on loan from San Telmo.

Career
Quiroz began playing at an early age for the youth of Monseñor Rösch, who preceded spells in the academies of Wanderers de Concordia, where he made his senior bow as a fifteen-year-old, and Colón. In his senior career with Colón, he was an unused substitute on six occasions for the club in 2017 and 2018 - four of which came in Primera División matches while the other two occurred in the Copa Sudamericana in mid-2018 for ties with São Paulo and Atlético Junior. His professional bow eventually arrived on 28 January 2019, with the defender completing the full ninety minutes of a 2–0 victory over Argentinos Juniors.

After nine appearances for Colón, Quiroz departed on loan in January 2020 to Primera B Nacional's Agropecuario. He didn't make an appearance in the second tier, before returning to his parent club in June. In October 2020, Quiroz terminated his contract with Colón and soon moved to Paraguayan Primera División club General Díaz. He debuted in a 4–3 home defeat to Libertad on 11 November, featuring for fifty-six minutes before being replaced by Diego Doldán.

On 1 March 2021, Quiroz returned to his homeland and joined San Telmo. In January 2022, Quiroz joined San Martín de Tucumán on a loan deal until the end of 2023 with a purchase option.

Career statistics
.

References

External links

1998 births
Living people
People from Concordia, Entre Ríos
Argentine footballers
Association football defenders
Argentine expatriate footballers
Expatriate footballers in Paraguay
Argentine expatriate sportspeople in Paraguay
Argentine Primera División players
Paraguayan Primera División players
Club Atlético Colón footballers
Club Agropecuario Argentino players
General Díaz footballers
San Telmo footballers
San Martín de Tucumán footballers
Sportspeople from Entre Ríos Province